Victor Gerard Marie Marijnen (21 February 1917 – 5 April 1975) was a Dutch politician of the defunct Catholic People's Party (KVP) now the Christian Democratic Appeal (CDA) party and jurist who served as Prime Minister of the Netherlands from 24 July 1963 until 14 April 1965.

Marijnen studied Law at the Radboud University Nijmegen obtaining a Master of Laws degree followed by a postgraduate education in Agricultural economics at the Rotterdam School of Economics where he obtained a Bachelor of Economics degree. Marijnen worked as a civil servant for the Ministries of Economic Affairs and Agriculture and Fisheries from August 1941 until November 1957 and as a trade association executive for the Christian Farmers and Gardeners association (CBTB) February 1949 until April 1951 and for the Catholic Employers association (AKWV) from November 1957 until May 1959. After the election of 1959 Marijnen was appointed as Minister of Agriculture and Fisheries in the Cabinet De Quay taking office on 19 May 1959. After the election of 1963 Marijnen was asked to lead a new cabinet and following a successful cabinet formation formed the Cabinet Marijnen and became Prime Minister of the Netherlands taking office on 24 July 1963.

The cabinet fell just 19 months into its term and he wasn't offered a post in the new cabinet. Marijnen left office following the installation of the Cabinet Cals on 14 April 1965 but returned as a Member of the House of Representatives serving from 27 April 1965 until his resignation on 14 January 1966 as a backbencher. Marijnen also became active in the public sector as a non-profit director and served on several state commissions and councils on behalf of the government. Marijnen continued to be active in politics and in September 1968 was nominated as the next Mayor of The Hague taking office on 16 October 1968. On 5 April 1975 Marijnen died after suffering a fatal heart attack at his home at the age of just 58.

Marijnen was known for his abilities as a skillful manager and effective consensus builder. During his premiership, his cabinet were responsible for several major reforms to health insurance, the public broadcasting system and dealing with the fallout of the marriage between Princess Irene and carlist Carlos Hugo of Bourbon-Parma. He holds the distinction as the last Prime Minister to have served as Mayor and his premiership is consistently regarded both by scholars and the public to have been below average.

Biography

Early life

Victor Gerard Marie Marijnen was born in Arnhem on 21 February 1917. In 1941 he graduated in law from the Radboud University Nijmegen and went on to work in the accountancy divisions of the Ministry of Agriculture, Nature and Food Quality. In 1945 he was seconded to the Council for the Restitution of Legal Rights.

In 1949 Marijnen became secretary of the Agricultural Society and in 1951 Secretary-General of the Foreign Agricultural Trade Department of the Ministry of Agriculture, Nature and Food Quality. From 1957 he was secretary of the General Catholic Employers Association and the Catholic Federation of Employers Associations.

Accusations regarding priests
In 1956 Marijnen was chairman of a children's home in Gelderland where children, including Henk Heithuis, were sexually abused by priests. According to the Telegraph newspaper, reporting in March 2012, he "intervened to have prison sentences dropped against several priests convicted of abusing children." The Dutch Catholic Church organised the castration of Heithuis while he lived at the Gelderland children's home in 1956 after he reported being sexually abused to the police.

Politics
In the De Quay cabinet, Marijnen was Minister of Agriculture and Fisheries. He served as Prime Minister of the Netherlands from 24 July 1963 until 14 April 1965.

The natural gas reserves, recently found in Slochteren were a considerable boost for the economy. This, combined with labour shortage led to a rise in wages and the attraction of foreign workers. Despite this being the second cabinet without socialist Labour Party, the building up of a welfare state, that was started after World War II, continued with the introduction of minimum wages in 1964 and the national health service. In 1965, measures were taken against commercial television stations transmitting from the North Sea. The cabinet finally fell over the issue if commercial TV should be allowed in the Netherlands.

From 1965 to 1966 Marijnen was a member of the House of Representatives and concurrently chairman of the Board of the Rijnmond Authority. In 1967 he was also appointed chairman of the Post and Telecommunications Council. On 16 October 1968 he was selected Mayor of The Hague.

Marijnen died on 5 April 1975 in The Hague, while serving as Mayor from a heart attack at the age of 58.

Decorations

References

External links

  Mr. V.G.M. (Victor) Marijnen Parlement & Politiek
  Kabinet-Marijnen Rijksoverheid

 

 
 
 

1917 births
1975 deaths
Agricultural economists
Catholic People's Party politicians
Dutch academic administrators
Dutch nonprofit directors
Dutch nonprofit executives
Dutch people of World War II
Dutch trade association executives
Dutch Roman Catholics
Erasmus University Rotterdam alumni
Grand Officers of the Order of Orange-Nassau
Mayors of The Hague
Ministers of Agriculture of the Netherlands
Ministers of General Affairs of the Netherlands
Ministers of Health of the Netherlands
Ministers of Social Affairs of the Netherlands
Fisheries ministers of the Netherlands
Members of the House of Representatives (Netherlands)
Members of the Social and Economic Council
Prime Ministers of the Netherlands
Radboud University Nijmegen alumni
Academic staff of Radboud University Nijmegen
People from Arnhem
20th-century Dutch civil servants
20th-century Dutch economists
20th-century Dutch jurists
20th-century Dutch politicians